Change is the fifth studio album by British girl group Sugababes, released through Island Records on 1 October 2007. It was their first album to feature complete vocals by Amelle Berrabah, who joined the group following remaining founding member Mutya Buena's departure in 2005.

Musically, Change is a pop, dance-pop, and pop rock album, while being produced by fellow collaborators Xenomania, Dallas Austin and Jony Rockstar, along with newer producers Dr. Luke, Danish production team Deekay, and Novel. The album was preceded by its lead single "About You Now", which became Sugababes' sixth number one single on the UK Singles Chart and their highest selling single in the UK. Two other songs off the album were later released as singles; the title track, and "Denial". Another track, "My Love is Pink", was the only promotional single off the album. Commercially, Change debuted atop of the UK Albums Chart, where it became the band's second number one album, and was eventually certified platinum by the BPI for selling 300,000 units in the country.  Elsewhere, it reached the top ten in Estonia and Ireland. In France, the album was adapted as the group's first greatest hits compilation.

Change would receive mixed reviews, with several critics applauding tracks seen off the album and complimenting its production, while others called it a "mixed bag". To promote the album, Sugababes' would perform tracks off the album at talk shows and embarked on the Change Tour in 2008.

Background and release
In June 2006, the Sugababes began working on then-untitled fifth studio album which was confirmed for release in 2007. However, group member Heidi Range also revealed that a greatest hits album would be released in time for Christmas 2006, which would include all of the group's hits. Following the release of Overloaded: The Singles Collection, the Sugababes continued working with a number of American producers on their fifth studio album, the band's first full studio album with then-new member Amelle Berrabah. Although, it was Amelle's first production, some of the songs from the album were leftover tracks that were originally intended to appear on Taller in More Ways (2005).

The album was produced by Higgins and production team Xenomania, known for their work on other Sugababes singles including "Round Round", "Angels with Dirty Faces", "Hole in the Head", "In the Middle", and "Red Dress". The mixing process was undertaken by Jeremy Wheatley for 365 Artists at Twenty One Studios, located in London, England. This was assisted by Richard Edgeler. Keyboards and programming were provided by Powell, Higgins, Cowling and Matt Gray, while Coler was responsible for the guitar present in the song.

AXM Magazine reported the Sugababes' assumed attempt to move into the American market with the album. On 30 August 2007, the group appeared on The Album Chart Show to perform the first single, "About You Now", and premiere another two album cuts. They also confirmed that the album's title would be Change.

When inserted into the computer, the UK edition disc allows access to bonus features such as remix versions of "About You Now" and a special interview with the group, plus wallpapers and photos. The French edition of Change is a greatest hits compilation because Overloaded: The Singles Collection was not released there, and it contains all their hits since "Overload" to "Denial".

"Never Gonna Dance Again" was written by Sugababes members Keisha Buchanan and Heidi Range in collaboration with Miranda Cooper, Brian Higgins, Tim Powell, Lisa Cowling and Nick Coler. The song was originally written and recorded with former group member Mutya Buena for the group's previous album Taller in More Ways, but was cut from the final track listing due to the girls not being fond of the song. During production of the fifth album, they came back to the song and grew to like it, prompting the group to add it to the track listing of Change.

The song "About You Now" was used in the movie Wild Child and features as track three on the soundtrack. In December 2007, "3 Spoons of Suga" was included on the soundtrack for the 2007 film St Trinian's.

Songs
"About You Now" is an uptempo pop rock song that received generally favourable reviews from both music critics and fans alike. PopJustice reviewer Peter Robinson, who noted a similarity to Kelly Clarkson's 2004 single "Since U Been Gone" (also produced by Dr. Luke), described the song as a "pop-electro-rock masterpiece" and dubbed it "the best Sugababes single" since 2002's Round Round. He praised the song's unselfconsciousness and its "very pleased-to-be-exactly-what-it-is" attitude and noted that "it doesn't sound anything like what the Sugababes have done before but it is instantly recognisable as a Sugababes song".

"Never Gonna Dance Again" is a midtempo pop song that displays musical elements of dance-pop. Nick Levine of Digital Spy wrote that the song's "desperately sad disco lament" is composed "almost entirely at mid-tempo." Fraser McAlpine of the BBC characterized the track as a "dancefloor tearjerker", similar to "Closer" by Ne-Yo and "Teardrops" by Womack & Womack, whereas The Trades writer Paul Schultz called it a "break-up ode".

Lyrically, "Never Gonna Dance Again" is about the break-up of a relationship which is set on a dancefloor. During the chorus, Sugababes sing the lines "I lost the rhythm when you said it's over / As the final record starts to fade, I feel the dancefloor turning colder". The Guardians Alexis Petridis and Schultz have both noted that the song's lyrical content is reminiscent to that of George Michael's song, "Careless Whisper".

"Never Gonna Dance Again" garnered a mixed reception from music critics. McAlpine wrote that the song "immediately feels like the girls have struck gold again". Levine suggested that "Never Gonna Dance Again", along with the album's singles "Denial" and "Change", demonstrates the group has "managed to grow up without losing their way with a melody". He elaborated that the song "seems to showcase a more reflective Sugababes". Petridis called it a "classy" example of the group's "trademark clever, referential pop", while The Independent'''s Andy Gill praised Xenomania's production of the song, saying that it "makes the most of its winningly logical melody".

Ally Carnwath of The Observer wrote that the track is a "surprisingly energetic mope around the disco", although admitted that the "elegiac tone" of the song's lyrics is a "real comedown". A writer for The Scotsman criticized it as a "dreary, formulaic break-up song", additionally noting that the track is not catchy like "About You Now". An editor for Stornoway Gazette admitted that although disco-friendly, "Never Gonna Dance Again" is the album's starting point of "disappointment", while saying that it "has the feeling of being tired and slightly jaded in comparison to the strength of the previous offering", referring to the album's lead single "About You Now". NME wrote that it seems "less than a threat and more of a promise."

"3 Spoons of Suga" is an uptempo pop song, with elements of dance-pop. Nick Levine of Digital Spy described it as a "Nancy Sinatra-style pop strut". He also suggested that the song "doesn't sound like anything the Sugababes have recorded before", and went on to name it a "kissing cousin" to the group's 2008 single, "Girls". Levine noted that "Boys and Girls" by Pixie Lott has a "passing resemblance" to "3 Spoons of Suga". Matt O'Leary of Virgin Media noted the incorporation of a guitar in the "beat-led dancefloor" track. An editor from The Scotsman suggested the line "He don't get stressed cos he's blessed by the cut of his jeans" was reminiscent of songs released by British girl group Girls Aloud.

"3 Spoons of Suga" garnered favorable reviews from music critics. Lauren Murphy of Entertainment Ireland described it as "villainous pop" and wrote that it epitomises the "sexy 'give-a-damn' attitude that Sugababes have pretty much built their career upon." Tom Young of BBC admitted that "3 Spoons of Suga" was "ridiculously titled", yet "ridiculously catchy". According to him, the song contains "simple rocky edge" that gives the "rich textured voices" of Berrabah and Buchanan "plenty of room in which to excel." Victoria Segal of The Times wrote that the "sticky disco of 3 Spoons of Suga should stop Mutya Buena's victory lap in its tracks". The Scotsmans editor felt that the song has a "playful attitude" which is missing from the rest of the album. Emily Mackay of Yahoo! Music suggested that it was one of the stronger tracks on the album, writing "the check-me-the-f*ck-out glammy strut of '3 Spoons of Suga' finds them [Sugababes] on stronger footing." Paul Schultz The Trades regarded it as a "ridiculously danceable Bananarama mimicry" and "stirring anthem".

Reception
Critical response

The album received mixed reviews, with The Guardian calling it a "mixed bag" but applauding tracks such as "Never Gonna Dance Again" and "Back Down". The Times claimed that the album was "only slightly better than All Saints outtakes, all dated production and pop tastefulness" but complimented tracks such as "My Love Is Pink" and "3 Spoons of Suga".

Commercial performance
The album's first single, "About You Now", was digitally released on 24 September 2007 in the United Kingdom, with the physical single release a week later. The song became Sugababes' sixth number-one single in the UK and their most successful to date. The second release from the album, "Change", was digitally released on 10 December and physically released on 17 December, charting at number thirteen. "My Love Is Pink" was also released as a digital promo single on 10 December. The third and final single from the album, "Denial", was digitally released on 10 March 2008 and physically released on 17 March, peaking at number fifteen.

Track listing

Notes
 denotes additional producer
 denotes vocal producer

Change (compilation album)

The Sugababes' greatest hits album, Overloaded: The Singles Collection, was not released in France, and the French edition of Change was adapted to become a greatest hits compilation. The album features the original Overloaded track listing, with the addition of "About You Now", "Denial" and "Change", the three singles released from the international edition of Change''.

Track listing

Notes

  includes vocals of Mutya Buena
  includes vocals of Amelle Berrabah
  includes vocals of Siobhan Donaghy

Personnel
 Dallas Austin – drums, keyboards, producer
 JC Chasez – vocal producer
 Nick Coler – guitar
 Miranda Cooper – keyboards, programming
 Pete Craigie – engineer, mixing
 Richard Edgeler – assistant
 Serban Ghenea – mixing
 Aniela Gottwald – assistant
 Lukasz "Doctor Luke" Gottwald – bass, guitar, drums, programming
 Matt Gray – keyboards, programming
 Brian Higgins – keyboards, programming, producer, mixing
 Tim McEwan – percussion
 Tom Nichols – percussion, programming, producer
 Andrew Nitsch – assistant engineer
 Rohan Onraet – engineer
 Chris Parmenidis – mastering
 Tim Powell – keyboards, programming, mixing
 Kurt Read – engineer
 Tony Reyes – guitar
 Tim Roberts – assistant
 Johnny Rockstar – bass, programming, producer, beats
 Rick Sheppard – engineer
 Alonzo "Novel" Stevenson – keyboards, vocals (background), producer, drum programming
 Tim VanDerKuil – bass
 Jeremy Wheatley – keyboards, drum programming, mixing
 Steven Wolf – producer
 Jordan "DJ Swivel" Young – engineer

Charts and certifications

Weekly charts

Year-end charts

Certifications

Release history

Tour

References

2007 albums
Sugababes albums
Albums produced by Dallas Austin
Albums produced by Dr. Luke
Albums produced by Xenomania
Island Records albums